Discoidin domain (also known as F5/8 type C domain,  or C2-like domain) is major protein domain of many blood coagulation factors.

Blood coagulation factors V and VIII contain a C-terminal, twice repeated, domain of about 150 amino acids, which is often called "C2-like domain" (that is unrelated to the C2 domain). In the Dictyostelium discoideum (Slime mold) cell adhesion protein discoidin, a related domain, named discoidin I-like domain, DLD, or DS, has been found which shares a common C-terminal region of about 110 amino acids with the FA58C domain, but whose N-terminal 40 amino acids are much less conserved. Similar domains have been detected in other extracellular and membrane proteins. In coagulation factors V and VIII the repeated domains compose part of a larger functional domain which promotes binding to anionic phospholipids on the surface of platelets and endothelial cells. The C-terminal domain of the second FA58C repeat (C2) of coagulation factor VIII has been shown to be responsible for phosphatidylserine-binding and essential for activity. FA58C contains two conserved cysteines in most proteins, which link the extremities of the domain by a disulfide bond. A further disulfide bond is located near the C-terminal of the second FA58C domain in MFGM .

Human proteins containing this domain 
AEBP1;     BTBD9;   CASPR4;    CNTNAP1;   CNTNAP2;   CNTNAP3;   CNTNAP4; CNTNAP5;   CPXM1;     CPXM2;     DCBLD1;    DCBLD2;    DDR1;      DDR2;      EDIL3;
F5;        F8;        F8B;       MFGE8;     NRP1;      NRP2;      RS1;       SSPO; UNC13A

References

Notes

Further reading

Protein domains
Single-pass transmembrane proteins